Kfoury is a surname. It may refer to:

Basil Kfoury (1794-1859), bishop of the Melkite Greek Catholic Archeparchy of Alexandria
Dionysius Kfoury, (1879-1965), bishop of the Melkite Greek Catholic Archeparchy of Alexandria
Wael Kfoury (born awch al Oumara, Zahlé, Lebanon), known by his stage name Wael Kfoury (وائل كفوري), Lebanese singer
Bechara Kfoury (1943-2015), former Lebanese entrepreneur and philanthropist from Chekka, Lebanon

See also
Kafoury